Linux for Tegra (Linux4Tegra, L4T) is a Linux based system software distribution by Nvidia for the Tegra processor series, used in platforms like the Nvidia Jetson board series. It is similar to Nvidia's Vibrante Linux distribution.

This system software comes with JetPack, a Software Development Kit (SDK) from Nvidia. The official Nvidia download page bears an entry for JetPack 3.2 (uploaded there on 2018-03-08) that states:
JetPack 3.2 adds support for the Linux for Tegra r28.2 image for the Jetson OS. It is packaged with newer versions of Tegra System Profiler, TensorRT, and cuDNN from the last release.

References

Tegra
Linux distributions